Test article may refer to:

Test article (aerospace)
Test article (food and medicine)
Test article (engineering), part of nondestructive testing